Padalam (படாளம்) is an important and an emerging suburb of South-west Chennai, located along the busy GST Road.

Villages in Kanchipuram district